Tino Wenzel (born 18 December 1973 in Ibbenbüren, North Rhine-Westphalia) is a German sport shooter. He won a gold medal for the men's skeet shooting at the 2006 ISSF World Cup in Suhl, and bronze at the 2003 ISSF World Cup in New Delhi, India, accumulating scores of 145 and 147 targets, respectively. Wenzel is also the husband of Olympic bronze medalist Christine Brinker.

At age thirty-four, Wenzel made his official debut for the 2008 Summer Olympics in Beijing, where he competed in the men's skeet shooting, along with his teammate Axel Wegner. He finished only in thirteenth place by one point ahead of Italian shooter and former Olympic champion Ennio Falco from the final attempt, for a total score of 117 targets.

References

External links
NBC 2008 Olympics profile

1973 births
Living people
People from Ibbenbüren
Sportspeople from Münster (region)
German male sport shooters
Skeet shooters
Olympic shooters of Germany
Shooters at the 2008 Summer Olympics